The Chinese Museum or Museum of Chinese Australian History is an Australian history museum located in Melbourne's Chinatown, which is dedicated to documenting, preserving and displaying the history, heritage and culture of Australia's Chinese community. The museum was established in 1985 with a charter to present the history of Australians of Chinese ancestry. An extensive refurbishment funded by the Victorian Government was completed in 2010. Since then, the museum has also acted as a Chinatown Visitor Centre.

The building that currently houses the museum was built by the Cohen Bros in 1890 and used as a warehouse for the manufacture of furniture. It was later sold to Her Majesty's Theatre and used as a storage space for their extensive collection of costumes. In 1984 the Victorian Government, with support from the Victorian Tourism Commission, the Chinese Community and the Melbourne City Council the building was purchased from Her Majesty's Theatre and the museum formally established. There is temporary exhibition space in which local and international artists can present work that engages with the Chinese culture.

The museum has a range of permanent exhibitions relating to Chinese experiences in the 19th century Australian Goldfields and uses objects from their extensive collection to tell stories that highlight the relationships between Australians and Chinese culture. Across five floors, the Chinese Museum holds an extensive collection of Chinese clothing and textiles, photographs, documents and artifacts that reflect the social fabric and activities of the Chinese community in Australia from the 1850s. The fifth floor houses the One Million Stories Exhibition, which details Australia's Chinese history and showcases the contribution Chinese Australians have made to Australian Society over 200 years, including the story of recent arrivals from the Asia Pacific region. The fourth floor houses the museum's temporary exhibition gallery. At the basement, there is the Finding Gold experience, which tells the story about the life of Chinese miners on the Victorian goldfields. On the ground floor is the Dragon Gallery, which is home to Dai Loong and the Millennium Dragon, the largest Chinese dragon in the world. The commissioning Dai Loong has been credited with reviving the lost craft of dragon-making in the Chinese city of Foshan in the late 1970s; Chinese dragon production in the city was halted from 1949 due to cultural suppression, so samples from Melbourne's parade dragons were delivered to the descendant of a dragon craftsman, with the subsequent work on Melbourne's dragons resulting in the revival of the dormant industry.

The museum has over 8,000 items such as household items, tools, and clothing, The collection also includes fifty oral history recordings, aas well as films, documents, and photographs.

Notes

References 
Chinese Museum History
Chinese Museum Dragon Gallery

External links

Chinese Museum website.
Chinese Museum on Facebook.
Chinese-Australian Historical Images in Australia, which includes the museum's photograph collection.
Museum of Chinese Australian History on the Collections Australia Network (organisation identifier: 1275).
Museum of Chinese Australian History on the National Library of Australia's Trove site (NLA party 783325).

Museums in Melbourne
Buildings and structures in Melbourne City Centre
Asian-Australian culture in Melbourne
Ethnic museums in Australia
History museums in Australia
Museums of Chinese culture abroad
Chinese-Australian culture
Chinese-Australian history
Australia–China relations
1985 establishments in Australia